Arturo Pacheco Altamirano (1903 – 1978) was a painter born in Chillán, Chile.  He died in Santiago in 1978.

External links
Museo de Arte Contemporáneo: Arturo Pacheco Altamirano

1903 births
1978 deaths
People from Chillán
20th-century Chilean painters
Chilean male artists
Chilean male painters
Male painters
20th-century Chilean male artists